Wilfrid Joseph Waluchow (born 1953), known as Wil Waluchow or W. J. Waluchow, is a Canadian philosopher, currently the Senator William McMaster Chair in Constitutional Studies at McMaster University, where he has taught since 1984. General jurisprudence and the philosophy of constitutional law are his main research interests.

After studying for his undergraduate and master's degrees at the University of Western Ontario, he went on to Oxford University to study philosophy of law under the supervision of H. L. A. Hart. Two notable contributions to the discipline are Inclusive Legal Positivism (1994), defending the inclusivist version of legal positivism and A Common Law Theory of Judicial Review: The Living Tree (2007).

References

1953 births
Canadian philosophers
Living people
Philosophers of law